Alliebrack National School, also known as St. Caillín's National School, is a national school in Ireland. It is situated on the west coast of Connemara, near the village of Ballyconneely.

The school was built in 1884 and had one teacher, Mr.McHale. The school had only one room when it was first built.

In January 1940, a tragedy occurred when there was an unexplained fire in the school. The school was burnt down and a local priest, Canon Cunningham, arranged with Robert Blake, the owner of Bunowen Castle, that the children would have their lessons in the castle while the school was rebuilt.

At that time, the castle was in a poor condition having had a leaking roof, damp walls and rotten floorboards. The school was rebuilt in 1945 and the children and teachers moved back into the new building. The school was named after Saint Caillín, a local saint who was said to have banished all vermin from Chapel Island and the Patron Saint of fishermen. The 13th of November every year is St. Caillín's day and Aillebrack is the only school in Ireland to get a holiday on that day.

In 1933 there were 65 children in the school. As of 2018, there is 39. When Dunloughan school closed down in 1967, the children transferred to Aillebrack school.

References

Connemara
Schools in the Republic of Ireland